Group B was one of the two groups of competing nations at the 2020 AFF Championship. It consisted of title holders Vietnam, Malaysia, Indonesia, Cambodia and Laos. The matches took place from 6 to 19 December 2021.

Indonesia and Vietnam as the top two teams advanced to the semi-finals.

Teams

Standings

Matches

Cambodia vs Malaysia

Laos vs Vietnam

Malaysia vs Laos

Indonesia vs Cambodia

Laos vs Indonesia

Vietnam vs Malaysia

Cambodia vs Laos

Indonesia vs Vietnam

Vietnam vs Cambodia

Malaysia vs Indonesia

References

Notes

External links
 Official Website

Group stage